Horace Worth Vaughan (December 2, 1867November 10, 1922) was an American lawyer, jurist, and politician. He represented Texas in the United States House of Representatives and the United States Senate. In 1915, he received an appointment as assistant Attorney General in the Territory of Hawaii, where he lived the rest of his life.

Early life

Vaughan was born to attorney George T. and Tippah Leary Vaughan, on December 2, 1867 in Marion County, Texas. He was of English ancestry, descended from early Jamestown, Virginia settler John Vaughn. He married Pearl Lockett in 1888.  They were the parents of Aileen, Robert Louis and Jean.

Vaughan was mostly self-taught, by reading his father's books. He was admitted to the bar in 1885, and began an active practice the next year.

Legislative career

Texas

From 1890 to 1898 he was city attorney for Texarkana, Texas.
From 1910 until 1912 he was a member of the Texas State Senate and in the United States House of Representatives from 1913 to 1915.

Hawaii

Vaughan moved to Honolulu in the Territory of Hawaii and became assistant United States district attorney  on October 1, 1915. By December 22, 1915, he was promoted to United States district attorney, and after the retirement of Sanford B. Dole. He was appointed by Woodrow Wilson as judge of the territorial United States District Court for the District of Hawaii on May 15, 1916.

Vaughan was a political supporter of Woodrow Wilson and advocated states to pass prohibition, which he opposed at a national level because he believed that it would violate states rights.

Personal life and death

Vaughan married Pearl Lockett on November 21, 1888. The couple had three children.

Their only son US Navy Lt. Robert Louis Vaughan (1892–1920) died in a plane crash related to his military service. Believed to be despondent over the death of his son, Horace Vaughan was found on November 10, 1922 in his Honolulu home with a bullet wound to his neck and a gun by his side, an apparent suicide. He was buried in Oahu Cemetery. Pearl Vaughan died in 1960.

Oldest daughter Aileen V. Eppler (1890–1976) was the wife of Texas financial consultant William E. Eppler. At some point, the Eppler family moved to New Jersey where Aileen died at age 85.

Youngest daughter Jean Vaughan Gilbert (1904–1975) was one of the first women lawyers in Hawaii, and became city attorney of Honolulu. She died in 1975 in Honolulu.

Fraternal memberships

Freemasons
Odd Fellows
Woodmen of the World

References

External links

 
 

1867 births
1922 suicides
American politicians who committed suicide
Suicides by firearm in Hawaii
People from Marion County, Texas
People from Cass County, Texas
People from Texarkana, Texas
Texas lawyers
Democratic Party Texas state senators
United States Attorneys for the District of Hawaii
Judges of the United States District Court for the Territory of Hawaii
People from Honolulu
American temperance activists
Democratic Party members of the United States House of Representatives from Texas
Burials at Oahu Cemetery
Activists from Texas
19th-century American lawyers
United States district court judges appointed by Woodrow Wilson